Pavetta australiensis is a species of flowering plant in the family Rubiaceae, found in drier rainforest areas in north eastern Australia and Papua New Guinea.

References

australiensis
Flora of New South Wales
Flora of Queensland
Flora of Papua New Guinea
Plants described in 1934